Elna Mygdal (1868–1940) was a Danish textile artist, museum curator and writer. She is remembered in particular for her interest in Hedebo embroidery and for her collection of folk costumes and folk textiles. In 1930, she published the authoritative two-volume Amagerdragter: vævninger og syninger on the history of costumes and textiles from Amager, an island adjacent to Copenhagen.

Biography
Born on 2 June 1868 in Nørre-Snede, Elna Mygdal was the daughter of Jes Mygdal (1819–1891) and his wife Charlotte née Thorkildsen (1832–1871). For a woman of her day, she was surprisingly well educated. She attended Copenhagen's Arts and Crafts School for Women where she studied embroidery and free-hand drawing. She also learnt weaving at John Lenning's school in Norrköping, Sweden, graduating in 1895. She went on to study painting in the women's section of the Royal Danish Academy of Fine Arts, earning a painting diploma in 1904.

During her studies, she taught a wide variety of subjects at the Arts and Crafts School, including painting, drawing, design and handicrafts. In 1897, in connection with an exhibition in Stockholm where she won a silver medal, she met }, director of the Danish Folk Museum. He encouraged her to continue her studies into the history of textiles, giving her access to the museum's holdings. As a result, in 1898 she was able to publish an article on Dansk Hvidsøm (Danish White Stitch) in Tidsskrift for Kunstindustri.

In the early 20th-century, Mygdal designed a series of white damask tableware patterns for De Forenede Linnedvarefabrikker. She also created works in colour for the churches in Valby and Herlufsholm. She developed a special interest in the white-stitch textiles known as Hebedo embroidery, lecturing on the subject in 1909.

In 1919, Olsen finally persuaded Mygdal to give up teaching at the Arts and Crafts School and move to the Folk Museum as assistant curator. Her duties included teaching, acquiring textiles, cataloguing, and contributing articles to journals. These were mainly about tablecloths, church textiles, weaving and related techniques. In particular, she contributed articles to the Danish Tourist Board's yearbooks writing about costumes from various parts of the country, with titles beginning Lidt om Dragter fra... followed by the region. In 1932, she published an authoritative, self-illustrated book on Amagerdragter, Vævninger og Syninger. She chose to write about costumes and textiles from Amager as she was able to cycle there to carry out her research. She retired from employment at the museum in 1935, suffering from poor health.

Elna Mygdal died in Frederiksberg on 1 February 1940 and is buried in Solbjerg Park Cemetery.

References

1868 births
1940 deaths
Danish folklorists
Danish textile artists
Danish weavers
Directors of museums in Denmark
20th-century Danish writers
20th-century Danish women writers
Danish embroiderers